Family on Fire is a 2011 Nigerian film produced and directed by Tade Ogidan.
The film stars Saheed Balogun, Segun Arinze, Sola Fosudo and Sola Sobowale.
The film was premiered on November 4, 2011 at The Lighthouse Hall, Camberwell road, London.

Prominent actors and actress present includes; Kunle Afolayan, Richard Mofe Damijo,  Ramsey Nouah, Teju Babyface, Saheed Balogun, Segun Arinze and Bimbo Akintola.
It was premiered in Lagos State, southwestern Nigeria in April 2012. Notable actors in attendance were Femi Adebayo, Desmond Elliot, Yemi Shodimu and prominent Nigerians present were Molade Okoya-Thomas, a renowned Nigerian Business magnate, Abimbola Fashola and Oladipo Diya, a retired Lt. General and former Chief of the Defence Staff.

Plot
A young man, Kunle (Saheed Balogun) commits a grievous act that leaves his family members in anguish. In Lagos, Kunle hides cocaine in his mother's (Lanre Hassan) baggage before she pays a visit to his siblings, including the eldest brother Femi (Sola Fosudo) in London. His mother narrowly escapes from the British immigration officers.
A rescheduled flight to the UK foils Kunle's plans to retrieve the illegal drug. Before his arrival, Femi's wife (Sola Sobowale) incidentally sees it while unpacking the food items stuffed along with the drug. A student in London, Moyo who is sponsored by Femi, gets remunerated by the drug deals after stealing it from where it is hidden, but the enraged drug barons, led by the Don (Segun Arinze) and his gang, unleash terror on Kunle's family. Suspense fills the air when Femi or nobody makes any attempt to find Moyo at his school since he is assumed to be in danger. Contrary to expectations, he is on a celebration spree in London before his inevitable arrest.

Accolades
The film received two nominations at the 8th Africa Movie Academy Awards held on April 22, 2012 at the Expo Centre, Eko Hotel & Suites in Lagos, Nigeria. It was nominated for Best Nigerian Film and Best Film in an African Language. Both awards were won by Adesuwa and State Of Violence respectively.

Cast
Saheed Balogun
Segun Arinze
Sola Fosudo
Sola Sobowale
Bukky Amos
Lanre Hassan

References

Nigerian crime drama films
2012 films
2012 crime drama films
Yoruba-language films
Films set in London
Films set in Lagos
Films about dysfunctional families
Films about the illegal drug trade
Films about cocaine